Xeris is a genus of horntails found in North America and Eurasia. Achille Costa circumscribed the genus in 1894.

Synonyms
In 1987, Malkiat S. Saini and Devinder Singh circumscribed a new genus, Neoxeris upon their description of a new species, which they called Neoxeris melanocephala. In 2012, N. melanocephala was transferred to Xeris, making Neoxeris a junior synonym. X. melanocephalus was later synonymized with X. himalayensis.

Description
Characteristic features of Xeris compared to other genera of Siricidae genera include: a hind wing with which lacks a cell cup, a small vertical ridge behind the eye, and a metatibial spur.

Distribution
Xeris species are found in North America and Eurasia. In North America, they're found from the boreal forests in Alaska and Canada south through Chiapas in southern Mexico. They are found in temperate and boreal regions of Eurasia as well as mountains of southern Eurasia including Morocco, India, China, and Taiwan.

Species
, Xeris consists of sixteen species:

X. caudatus 

Xeris caudatus  was initially placed in the genus Urocerus by Ezra Townsend Cresson in his species description. Its type locality is the Colorado Territory.

X. chiricahua
Xeris chiricahua  was described by David R. Smith. Its type locality is Rustler Park, Chiricahua Mountains, Arizona.

X. cobosi
Xeris cobosi  was first described by M. G. de Viedma and F. J. Suárez as a subspecies of X. spectrum. It was moved to the species level in 2015. Its type locality is Tizi-Ifri, Morocco.

X. degrooti
Xeris degrooti  was described in 2015 by Henri Goulet. It is named in honor of Peter de Groot. Its type locality is Pennington County, South Dakota.

X. himalayensis
Xeris himalayensis
 was described by James Chester Bradley in 1934. Its type locality is Deoban, Chakrata, India. In 2015, it became considered the senior synonym of X. melanocephalus , whose type locality is Dalhousie, India.

X. indecisus
Xeris indecisus  was initially described by MacGillivray as a species in Urocerus. Its type locality is near Olympia, Washington. T. C. Maa classified it as a subspecies of X. morrisoni in 1949, but in 2012 it was reinstated to the species level.

X. malaisei
Xeris malaisei  was initially described as a subspecies of X. spectrum, but was promoted to the species level in 2015.

X. melancholicus

Xeris melancholicus  was described by John O. Westwood, who placed it in the genus Sirex. He listed the type locality as "America Septentrionalis".

X. morrisoni
Xeris morrisoni  was described by Ezra Townsend Cresson in 1880; he initially placed it in the genus Urocerus.

X. pallicoxae
Xeris pallicoxae  was described by Henri Goulet in 2015. The specific name means "pale coxae".

X. spectrum
Xeris spectrum  was described by Carl Linnaeus in 1758. Costa designated it to be the type species of Xeris.

X. tarsalis
Xeris tarsalis  was described by Ezra Townsend Cresson in 1880. Its type locality is Washington Territory, and Cresson initially placed it in the genus Urocerus.

X. tropicalis
Xeris tropicalis  was described by Henri Goulet in 2012. Its type locality is San Cristobal de las Casas,  in southern Mexico; the specific name tropicalis "tropical" reflects its habitat.

X. umbra
Xeris umbra  was described by Henri Goulet in 2015; its type locality is Yunnan Province, China and its name umbra "shadow" refers to the species' dark color.

X. xanthoceros
Xeris xanthoceros 
 was described by Henri Goulet in 2015. Its specific name means "yellow horn", referring to the female's flagellum. The type locality is Yunnan, China.

X. xylocola
Xeris xylocola  was described by Henri Goulet in 2015. The specific name means "living in wood". Its type locality is Houaphanh Province, Laos.

References

Siricidae
Taxa named by Achille Costa